Copthill is a village in County Durham, in England. It is situated on the north side of Weardale, between Cowshill and Cornriggs.

References

Villages in County Durham
Stanhope, County Durham